MUSEXPO is an international music, media & technology conference based in Los Angeles. Since its inception in 2005, MUSEXPO has played host to thousands of executives from all around the world and showcased 100+ artists from dozens of countries, many of which left with substantial outcomes. With participation from executives such as Larry King (CNN), Tom Anderson (Co-Founder, MySpace), Chad Hurley (Co-Founder, YouTube), Steve Schnur (Head of Music, Electronic Arts) and many others, MUSEXPO has continually stayed on top of what is current and relevant in today's music industry. Due to popular demand, the event has recently been launched internationally: including the fifth annual International Music, Media & Technology conference MUSEXPO 2009 on Sunday April 26 at the London West Hollywood Hotel,  One Movement MUSEXPO Asia Pacific in Perth, Western Australia October 6–10, 2010 and MUSEXPO Europe which takes place in Fall 2011. MUSEXPO LA will be held in Spring 2011.

MUSEXPO: Three Continents, One Vision.

Past artists that have showcased at MUSEXPO
Animal Alpha, Bloodpit, Breed 77, Cass Fox, Drawn from Bees, Deep Insight, Embrace (English band), Engerica, Evermore, Goldenhorse, Gomo, Infadels, Intercooler (band), Kwan, Missy Higgins, Mudmen, Pilot Speed, Poets of the Fall, Reamonn, Resin Dogs, Spazzys, The Boat People (Australian band), The Gift (band), The Temper Trap, Tina Dico, MENEW, Katy Perry, Jessie J and Losing Focus.

References

External links
 MUSEXPO Homepage

Music festivals in California
Music conferences
Music festivals established in 2005
2005 establishments in California